The 2022 Peach Bowl was a college football bowl game played on December 31, 2022, at Mercedes-Benz Stadium in Atlanta, Georgia. The 55th annual Peach Bowl and one of the two College Football Playoff semifinals, the game featured two of the four teams selected by the College Football Playoff Selection Committee—Georgia from the Southeastern Conference (SEC) and Ohio State from the Big Ten Conference. Georgia won, 42–41, when Ohio State kicker Noah Ruggles' potential game-winning 50-yard field goal with 3 seconds left in the game sailed wide left. Georgia advanced to face the winner of the Fiesta Bowl, TCU, in the 2023 College Football National Championship at SoFi Stadium in Inglewood, California on January 9, 2023. The game began at 8:21p.m. EST and was aired on ESPN. It was one of the 2022–23 bowl games concluding the 2022 FBS football season. Sponsored by restaurant chain Chick-fil-A, the game was officially known as the College Football Playoff Semifinal at the Chick-fil-A Peach Bowl.

College Football Playoff

Teams
The game featured Georgia, undefeated champion of the Southeastern Conference (SEC), and Ohio State, a one-loss team from the Big Ten Conference selected at-large by the College Football Playoff (CFP) committee. The only prior meeting between the two programs came in the 1993 Florida Citrus Bowl, a 21–14 Georgia victory.

Georgia

Georgia was undefeated in their 12-game regular season, facing and defeating two ranked FBS teams, Oregon and Tennessee. Their closest victory was by four points, over Missouri; all of their other wins were by at least 10 points. Georgia qualified for the SEC Championship Game, where they defeated LSU, 50–30. Georgia entered the Peach Bowl with an overall 13–0 record.

Ohio State

Ohio State won the first 11 games of their regular-season schedule, including victories over two ranked FBS teams, Notre Dame and Penn State. They lost to Michigan in their final regular-season contest, 45–23. Ohio State entered the Peach Bowl with an overall 11–1 record.

Broadcast
The Peach Bowl was televised by ESPN, with the primary Saturday Night Football commentary team, Chris Fowler on play-by-play, Kirk Herbstreit as analyst, and Holly Rowe and Laura Rutledge on the sidelines. The ESPN Radio broadcast was commentated by Joe Tessitore, Greg McElroy, and Katie George.

ESPN aired its MegaCast coverage for both College Football Playoff semifinals and the National Championship Game; the primary telecast aired on ESPN while other channels in the ESPN family of networks aired alternate broadcasts. ESPN2 aired "Field Pass" with The Pat McAfee Show, which featured Pat McAfee along with Robert Griffin III, Taylor Lewan, and A. Q. Shipley, among others. Audio from the main telecast was played on both ESPNU, which aired Command Center, and ESPNews, which aired the SkyCast (a continuous feed from the skycam). The All-22 broadcast, on the ESPN app, was paired with audio from the ESPN Radio broadcast. The hometown radio broadcasts from each team were shown on the ESPN app as well; Ohio State's radio broadcast was commentated by Paul Keels, Jim Lachey, and Matt Andrews. while Georgia's featured Scott Howard, Eric Zeier, and D.J. Shockley. ESPN Deportes carried the Spanish language-broadcast, featuring Eduardo Varela, Pablo Viruega and Sebastian M. Christensen.

Game summary
The game's officiating crew, representing the Pac-12 Conference, was led by referee Chris Coyte and umpire Greg Adams. The game was played indoors at Mercedes-Benz Stadium in Atlanta, Georgia.

First half
Georgia won the opening coin toss and elected to defer to the second half. Bulldogs kicker Jack Podlesny sent the opening kickoff into the end zone for a touchback, and Ohio State started at its own 25 yard line. The Buckeyes got a first down on their first play with an 11-yard pass from C. J. Stroud to Marvin Harrison, Jr., but Georgia then forced a fourth down with a sack on Stroud, causing the Buckeyes to punt. Starting on their own 26, Stetson Bennett completed four of his first five passes to drive the Bulldogs 48 yards into Ohio State territory; the drive would stall after Ohio State sacked Bennett on third and one. Podlesny attempted a 47-yard field goal, but the kick drifted wide left to keep the game scoreless.

Ohio State then marched 71 yards in only four plays to get the first score of the game. At the Georgia 31 yard line, Stroud scrambled to his right and directed Harrison Jr. toward his pass in the endzone for the touchdown. Noah Ruggles' kick was good to give the Buckeyes a 7-0 lead. On the ensuing drive, Georgia would quickly respond. Bennett completed all five of his passes and running back Daijun Edwards had an 18 yard run to get into OSU territory, as Georgia tied the game on a screen pass from Bennett to running back Kenny McIntosh which the latter took 25 yards into the endzone, followed by a good extra point from Podlesny.

Ohio State got the ball back at the 25 yard line and drove 35 yards in 6 plays before the first quarter came to an end. Their offense continued to perform at the start of the second quarter; Stroud connected with Harrison Jr. for a 24 yard gain, and though Kelee Ringo forced a fumble by Harrison, the ball bounced out of bounds to let Ohio State retain possession. Three plays later, Georgia committed pass interference against receiver Emeka Egbuka in the end zone, giving Ohio State a first down at the two yard line. Two plays later, running back Miyan Williams rushed into the end zone and Ruggles made the extra point to give the Buckeyes a 14-7 lead. On Georgia's first play of the following drive, Bennett threw a pass to McIntosh on the wheel route, but the ball was underthrown and the play was read by OSU linebacker Steele Chambers who intercepted the pass and returned it 15 yards to the Georgia 30 yard line. Ohio State quickly capitalized on the turnover; on the third play of their drive at the Georgia 16 yard line, Stroud eluded pressure from Georgia's defensive line yet again and threw to the back right corner of the end zone where Harrison Jr. secured the ball for his second touchdown. Ruggles' extra point made the score 21-7, and Georgia now trailed by their largest margin of the season.

Georgia proved to be unfazed by this adversity, however, as they responded with a 4-play touchdown drive featuring a 21-yard run by Edwards, a 47-yard pass from Bennett to Arian Smith, and finally an 11-yard touchdown run by Kendall Milton. Georgia's defense then forced Ohio State to go three-and-out, as their defensive line managed to sack Stroud on third down. On the first play of their ensuing drive, Georgia's rushing offense remained strong as McIntosh ran 52 yards to the Ohio State 10, only failing to score a touchdown due to unforced tripping. Georgia would then rush the ball twice more and tie the game on a three-yard quarterback keeper by Bennett. Georgia would then force another Buckeye three-and-out; Stroud completed a 9-yard pass on the Buckeyes' first play, but an incomplete pass and run for no gain made it fourth down and a yard. Ohio State initially attempted to convert the fourth down, but an illegal motion penalty sent the Buckeyes five yards pack and forced them to punt. Georgia then marched down the field once again in 8 plays, driven by a 28-yard pass from Bennett to Marcus Rosemy-Jacksaint and a 15-yard run by Milton; however, the drive would stall at the Ohio State 14. With 1:49 remaining in the half, Ohio State took a timeout to prevent Georgia from draining time off the clock, and Georgia took their first lead of the night with a 32 yard field goal by Podlesny, making the score 24-21.

Ohio State was able to capitalize on the time remaining and respond to Georgia's rally as Stroud completed four passes in a row for 75 yards; on the last one, Stroud found Xavier Johnson streaking up the middle of the field behind Georgia's safeties and completed the pass to him. Johnson spun away from an attempted tackle by safety Malaki Starks and got into the end zone for a 37-yard score. Following Ruggles' made extra point, Ohio State had retaken the lead 28-24 with 49 seconds left in the half. Georgia got the ball back at their own 25 and initially attempted to run a quick scoring drive, but after Bennett threw his first two passes incomplete, the Bulldogs elected to take a knee to run out the clock and prevent OSU from getting the ball back. The teams went into halftime with Ohio State leading Georgia, 28-24.

Second half
Ohio State kickoff specialist Jayden Fielding kicked off to the Georgia two yard line to open the second half, and Kearis Jackson returned it 27 yards to the 29. Bennett's struggles continued in the opening drive, as he threw two straight incomplete passes resulting in a three-and-out. On the other side, Ohio State's offense continued performing well as they drove 70 yards in six plays, keyed by big pass completions from Stroud to Julian Fleming and Egbuka. At the Georgia 10 yard line, Stroud ran a play action pass and found Egbuka streaking wide open toward the sideline; Egbuka caught the pass and turned upfield into the end zone before any Georgia defender was able to reach him. Ohio State led by multiple scores once again as Ruggles' extra point gave the Buckeyes a 35-24 lead. On the next drive, Georgia was able to get a first down on a 10-yard run by McIntosh, but were held to limited gain on their next two rushing plays and Bennett threw his fifth consecutive incomplete pass to cause the drive to stall and give Ohio State the ball back.

Georgia's defense was able to prevent Ohio State from widening their lead on the next drive, thanks to a sack on Stroud by defensive back Javon Bullard which forced a Buckeyes three-and-out. Jackson was able to return the punt 22 yards to the Ohio State 32, giving Georgia excellent field position. However, they were unable to capitalize on it as Ohio State once again held their running backs to minimal gains and sacked Bennett. The Bulldogs attempted a 52 yard field goal with Podlesny, one yard shy of his career long; the ball drifted just right of the goalposts to keep the score 35-24 in Ohio State's favor.

Stroud then led Ohio State back down the field; a 17-yard run by Dallan Hayden got the Buckeyes into Georgia territory, and Stroud had a 27 yard pass completion to Egbuka to get to the Georgia 10. A short run by Hayden and an incomplete pass left the Buckeyes with third down and goal at the Georgia 7. Stroud dropped back to pass, and was pursued by several Georgia defenders. While running backwards, Stroud lofted the ball toward the back of the end zone in the vicinity of Harrison Jr. Harrison Jr. got his hands on the falling ball, but was hit by Bullard which jarred the ball loose and caused it to fall incomplete. Harrison Jr. suffered a concussion from the hit and Bullard was called for a targeting penalty, which would have given Ohio State an automatic first down and goal. However, the call was overturned after video replay review, resulting in fourth and goal for Ohio State at the Georgia 7. The Buckeyes elected to kick a 25-yard field goal, which Ruggles made to extend the Buckeyes' lead back to 14, making the score 38-24.

On the final play of the third quarter, Bennett completed his first pass since the 1:49 mark of the second quarter to McIntosh for 17 yards. Bennett would complete his next three passes as Georgia marched to the Ohio State 13; facing fourth down and 6, Georgia elected to attempt a conversion, and Bennett hit tight end Brock Bowers on an out route two yards short of the first down marker. Despite being hit by OSU safety Lathan Ransom at that spot, Bowers was able to keep himself off the ground with his left hand and extend the football past the marker with his right hand mere seconds before going out of bounds. Georgia moved down to the Ohio State 3, but a botched lateral from Bennett to Ladd McConkey and incomplete pass left Georgia with fourth and goal at the Ohio State 13. The Bulldogs elected to kick the field goal, and Podlesny's 31 yard attempt was good to reduce Ohio State's lead to 11.

On their ensuing possession, Ohio State faced third and 7; Stroud picked up six yards on a scramble to make it fourth and 1. Ohio State lined up in punt formation, but ran a fake punt as the ball was snapped to tight end Mitch Rossi who ran for five yards. However, Georgia head coach Kirby Smart called a timeout right before Ohio State snapped the ball, nullifying the play. Their trick play exposed, Ohio State punted to Georgia following the timeout. Georgia then scored on the first play of their ensuing drive as Ransom slipped while covering Arian Smith on a fly route; Bennett completed the pass to the wide open Smith who got into the end zone with ease for a 76 yard touchdown. Now trailing 38-33, Georgia attempted a two-point conversion so they could potentially tie the game with a field goal. Bennett completed the pass to McConkey running an out route at the 1 yard line, and McConkey got past the goal line to give Georgia two points and make the score 38-35 in favor of Ohio State.

Ohio State then went on a methodical drive which used 5:58 of game clock. Stroud got into Georgia territory on a 17 yard scramble, and the Buckeyes made it to the Georgia 18 before Jamon Dumas-Johnson forced them back to the 30 with a sack of Stroud. Stroud's pass on third and long was incomplete, and Ruggles was sent to kick a 48 yard field goal, a career long for him. The kick was good, giving Ohio State a 41-35 lead with 2:43 remaining in the game.

Jackson returned Fielding's kickoff to the Georgia 28. On the drive, Bennett proceeded to go 5-for-5 passing for 72 yards, capping it off with a 10-yard pass to Adonai Mitchell on an end zone out route for the touchdown. Podlesny made the extra point, giving Georgia the 42-41 lead, only their second lead of the night, with 54 seconds remaining in the game.

On the third play of Ohio State's ensuing drive, Stroud scrambled for 27 yards to the Georgia 31 yard line to put the Buckeyes at the edge of Ruggles' field goal range. Their next play was a rush by Hayden which led to the loss of a yard, and Ohio State took a timeout with 19 seconds remaining. Stroud then threw two incomplete passes, giving Ohio State fourth and 11 at the Georgia 32 with eight seconds left in the game. Ruggles was sent to kick a 50-yard field goal, which if made would overtake his previous field goal as his career long. Georgia called a timeout before the kick to ice the kicker. Ruggles then attempted the field goal and it hooked wide to the left, giving Georgia the ball back with three seconds remaining in the game. Georgia was assessed an unsportsmanlike conduct penalty following the field goal attempt as several players on their bench rushed onto the field in celebration, but the penalty had no impact as Bennett kneeled to drain the clock down to zero and secure the win for Georgia.

Scoring summary

Statistics

See also
 2022 Celebration Bowl, contested at the same venue on December 17

References

Peach Bowl
Peach Bowl
Peach Bowl
Georgia Bulldogs football bowl games
Ohio State Buckeyes football bowl games
Peach Bowl
Peach Bowl